Brodsworth is a civil parish in the metropolitan borough of Doncaster, South Yorkshire, England.  The parish contains 24 listed buildings that are recorded in the National Heritage List for England.  Of these, one is listed at Grade I, the highest of the three grades, one is at Grade II*, the middle grade, and the others are at Grade II, the lowest grade.  The parish contains the village of Brodsworth and the surrounding area.  The most important building in the parish is Brodsworth Hall, which is listed, together with associated structures and items in the gardens and grounds.  The other listed buildings include houses, cottages and associated structures, farmhouses and farm buildings, a church, a milepost, and a school.


Key

Buildings

References

Citations

Sources

 

Lists of listed buildings in South Yorkshire
Buildings and structures in the Metropolitan Borough of Doncaster